Yuan Xiaoyu (born 19 August 1994) is a Chinese rower.

She won a medal at the 2019 World Rowing Championships.

References

External links

1994 births
Living people
Chinese female rowers
World Rowing Championships medalists for China